Megan Williams-Stewart (born June 27, 1987) is an American former competitive figure skater. She is the 2006 Ondrej Nepela Memorial champion and 2007 Nebelhorn Trophy silver medalist. She began representing Puerto Rico in the 2008–09 season and became the 2009 Puerto Rican national silver medalist.

Personal life
Williams-Stewart was born on June 27, 1987 in Takoma Park, Maryland. She was raised in Ellicott, Maryland. Her mother, Ellen Williams, competed in speed skating, appearing five times at the U.S. Speed Skating Championships and winning a medal at the North American Speed Skating Championships.

Career
Williams-Stewart first qualified for the U.S. Figure Skating Championships in the 2002–03 season. Skating on the junior level, she finished 13th at the 2003 U.S. Championships.

In the 2004–05 season, she qualified for the 2005 U.S. Championships on the senior level and placed 10th. Because of that placement, she was given a Junior Grand Prix assignment the following season.

In the 2005–06 season, Williams-Stewart competed at the 2005–06 ISU Junior Grand Prix event in Andorra and finished 5th. At the 2006 U.S. Championships, she repeated her 10th-place finish from the previous year.

In the 2006–07 season, having aged out of Juniors, Williams-Stewart was no longer eligible to compete on the Junior Grand Prix. She was sent to the 2006 Ondrej Nepela Memorial, a senior international competition, and won the event ahead of former European Champion Júlia Sebestyén. At the 2007 U.S. Championships, she placed 13th.

In the 2007–08 season, Williams-Stewart was assigned to another senior international competition, the Nebelhorn Trophy. There, she won the silver medal behind reigning European Champion Carolina Kostner and ahead of Finnish skater Laura Lepistö, who would go on to win the bronze medal at the 2008 European Championships. At the 2008 U.S. Championships, Williams-Stewart repeated her 13th-place finish of the previous year.

Following the 2007–08 season, Williams-Stewart switched to compete representing Puerto Rico. She was released by the U.S. Figure Skating Association in the summer of 2008 and began representing Puerto Rico in club competitions over the summer.

Programs

Competitive highlights

JGP: Junior Grand Prix

References

 Ondrej Nepela Memorial 2006 Ladies results

External links

 

American female single skaters
University of Delaware people
Puerto Rican figure skaters
People from Takoma Park, Maryland
1987 births
Living people
People from Ellicott City, Maryland